Your Lady (also known as Your Woman) is a 2013 South Korean television series starring Lee Yu-ri, Park Yoon-jae, Im Ho, Park Young-rin and Lee Byung-wook. The morning melodrama aired on SBS from February 18 to August 2, 2013, on Mondays to Fridays at 8:30 a.m. for 120 episodes.

Cast

Main characters
Lee Yu-ri as Lee Eun-soo/Oh Yoo-jung
Park Yoon-jae as Kang Jung-hoon
Im Ho as Na Jin-gu
Park Young-rin as Min Se-yeon
Lee Young-eun as young Min Se-yeon
Lee Byung-wook as Min Dong-yeon

Supporting characters
Jung Han-yong as Kang Man-bok
Lee Mi-young as Ma Pal-soon
Noh Hyun-hee as Ma Dong-hee
Yoon Mi-ra as Park Soon-ja
Kim Min-chan as Na Dae-gu
Jeon Hyeon-seok as Na Joon-hee
Lee Jin-ah as Lee Kyeong-seon
Yoo Ha-joon as Ji Hyeon-woo
Kang Ji-woo as So-ra
Kang Suk-jung as Hwang Jae-yeol
Jung Moon-sung as Kim Tae-seong
Lee Ji-hye as Manager Yang 
Kim Ha-yoo as Eun-soo
Ham Jin-sung as Tae-seong's subordinate

References

External links
Your Lady official SBS website 

Seoul Broadcasting System television dramas
2013 South Korean television series debuts
2013 South Korean television series endings
Korean-language television shows
South Korean melodrama television series
South Korean romance television series